Phase shift torque measurement is carried out by a torquemeter that uses a shaft connected between rotating machines such as a turbine and compressor or jet engine under test and a dynamometer.  A gear at each end of the shaft is surrounded by a coil. The gear produces a sine wave in the coil's eddy current magnetic field. Under no load the waves are in line with each other, as a load is applied to the shaft the waves shift out of phase with each other. Using Young's modulus calculations for the stiffness of the material the load or torque through the shaft can be measured highly accurately at speeds up to 150,000 rpm and torque up to 400,000 Nm.

Torque
Measurement
Dynamometers
Mechanical engineering